Events of 2020 in Somaliland.

Incumbents
President: Muse Bihi Abdi
Vice President: Abdirahman Saylici
 Speaker of the House: Bashe Mohamed Farah
 Chairman of Elders: Suleiman Mohamoud Adan
 Chief Justice: Adan Haji Ali
 Chief of Staff of Armed Forces: Nuh Ismail Tani

Events

January
January 2
Minister of Endowment and Religious Affairs announced the nation-level committee of Anti-FGM.
January 5
Culvert facilities that worth US$ 983,000 for construction of Burao -Erigavo Road arrive at Berbera Port.
January 30
European Union and Ministry of Planning sign €7.5 Million deal for Berbera Urban Development Project.

February
February 2
A commemoration ceremony of the 26th Anniversary of Somaliland Armed Forces held in national army command complex of Hargeisa.
February 8
Chairman of Chamber of Commerce and Minister of Commerce has traveled and welcomed in Netherlands.
February 18
President of Somaliland addressed the annual nation state at joint session of Parliament of Somaliland in Hargeisa.

March
March 2
Chairman of Sool Regional Court killed in an explosion attached to his car in Las Anod.
March 10
Two children died after a house fire at Mohamoud Haibe district in Hargeisa.
Yasin Haji Mohamoud foreign minister of Somaliland visited Uganda to boost bilateral relations.
March 14
House of Representatives is introduced for Sex and Rape Act to debate and discuss.
House of Elders is introduced for House of Representatives Elections Act to debate and discuss.
March 17
COVID-19 in Somaliland – President Bihi announces on closing schools across the country and banning all public gatherings, including sports events and festivals for 4 Weeks, effective midnight (EAT) on March 19. He also mentioned the suspend of flights from eight countries including China, Somalia, Kenya, Italy, Iran, France, South Korea and Spain.
March 25
COVID-19 in Somaliland – Somaliland's Committee of Preparation and Prevention of the Coronavirus announced that land borders with Ethiopia, Djibouti and Somalia are closed for 3 weeks, and the only things that can cross the borders is necessary goods including Food, Fuel and Medicines.
March 31
COVID-19 in Somaliland – The first two cases of coronavirus in Somaliland are confirmed.

April
April 1
COVID-19 in Somaliland – Muse Bihi orders the state Attorney General starting from Wednesday to release 574 inmates through Somaliland territories in a presidential decree due to coronavirus fears.

November 
November 14
A mine explosion in Balidhiig, Togdheer region, hits a school bus, killing one person and injuring two.

December
December 15
Somalia cuts diplomatic ties with Kenya after president Muse Bihi Abdi visits the country.

Deaths

January
January 6
Adan Ahmed Warsame – politician (born 1948)
January 10
Ahmed Keyse Dualeh – politician and diplomat (born 1922)

April
April 2
Abdirizak Mohamed Toor – politician
Yasin Ali Abdi – politician

See also
2020 in East Africa
COVID-19 pandemic in Africa

References

 
2020s in Somaliland
Somaliland
Somaliland